St. Paul Historic District may refer to:
St. Paul Historic District (Oregon)
St. Paul Historic District (Virginia)